Chicon may refer to:

 Chicon (plant), another name for chicory
 Chicon (Worldcon), a name given to World Science Fiction Conventions (Worldcons) that take place in Chicago, Illinois
 Chicón, a mountain in Peru